Alojz Colja (born 21 May 1943 in Bled) is a Slovenian rower who competed for Yugoslavia in the men's eight at the 1964 Summer Olympics.

External links 
 
 
 

1943 births
Living people
Yugoslav male rowers
Slovenian male rowers
People from Bled
Rowers at the 1964 Summer Olympics
Olympic rowers of Yugoslavia
European Rowing Championships medalists